Wooston Castle is an Iron Age Hill fort situated on the edge of a hill overlooking the Teign Valley in Devon some 200 metres above sea level, only 3 km south and east of Prestonbury Castle and 5 km east of Cranbrook Castle.

References

Hill forts in Devon
Moretonhampstead